Subramanian Arun Prasad (born 21 April 1988) is an Indian chess player. In 2008 he became India's 18th chess Grandmaster.

Born in Salem, Tamil Nadu, Arun Prasad won the 2004 Asian Under 16 Chess Championship in Tehran, Iran edging out Lê Quang Liêm on tiebreak score and as a result he earned the title of FIDE Master (FM). The same year he also won the Asian Junior Championship on tiebreak over J. Deepan Chakkravarthy in Bikaner, India. Thanks to this achievement Arun Prasad was awarded the title of International Master (IM).

In 2009 he became the first Indian to win the Open in the Scottish Chess Championship in Edinburgh, Scotland. In 2010 he was part of the bronze medal-winning Indian team in World Team Chess Championship in Bursa, Turkey, also winning the individual bronze medal on board 5. In 2011 he won the Paris Chess Championship. In 2015 Arun Prasad finished in third place on tiebreak at the Washington Open, a point behind Gata Kamsky.

References

External links
 
 
 
 Prasad Arun team chess record at OlimpBase.org

1988 births
Living people
Chess grandmasters
Indian chess players
People from Salem, Tamil Nadu